Kathryn Lyles is an American stage actress.

She began her career as an actress in third grade with her star turn as the title role in The Fisherman's Wife.  Since this role, Lyles has gone on to success in several productions.  She portrayed famous literary lesbian Gertrude Stein in William Turner's musicalization of Stein's A Lyrical Opera Made by Two. She has a BFA in Musical Theater from the University of the Arts in Philadelphia.

References

External links
 BroadwayWorld.com - Lists Kathryn Lyles as one of "the brightest new performers" in Baltimore live theatre.
 Philadelphia City Paper, February 10-16, 2005. "The Show Mustn't Go On" Review of Anyone Can Whistle by David Anthony Fox
 Talkin' Broadway: Review of Anyone Can Whistle at the Prince Music Theater, Philadelphia
 Official site.

Year of birth missing (living people)
American stage actresses
Living people
21st-century American women